Josephine Mary Singarayar (born 29 June 1967) is a Malaysian sprinter. She competed in the women's 400 metres at the 1988 Summer Olympics.

References

External links
 

1967 births
Living people
Athletes (track and field) at the 1988 Summer Olympics
Malaysian female sprinters
Olympic athletes of Malaysia
Athletes (track and field) at the 1990 Commonwealth Games
Commonwealth Games competitors for Malaysia
Place of birth missing (living people)
Asian Games medalists in athletics (track and field)
Asian Games bronze medalists for Malaysia
Southeast Asian Games medalists in athletics
Southeast Asian Games gold medalists for Malaysia
Medalists at the 1986 Asian Games
Medalists at the 1990 Asian Games
Athletes (track and field) at the 1986 Asian Games
Athletes (track and field) at the 1990 Asian Games
Competitors at the 1987 Southeast Asian Games
Olympic female sprinters
People from Ipoh